Lux, also known as Bryant or Wheelerville, is an unincorporated community in Covington County, Mississippi, United States. Lux is located on the former Gulf and Ship Island Railroad and was once home to a lumber mill. Lux was also formerly home to a school.

References

Unincorporated communities in Covington County, Mississippi
Unincorporated communities in Mississippi